Chromium(III) hydroxide is a gelatinous green inorganic compound with the chemical formula . It is a polymer with an undefined structure and low solubility.  It is amphoteric, dissolving in both strong alkalis and strong acids.
 In alkali: Cr(OH)3 + OH- -> CrO2- + 2 H2O
 In acid: Cr(OH)3(OH2)3 + 3 H+ -> Cr(OH2)6^3+

It is used as a pigment, as a mordant, and as a catalyst for organic reactions.

It is manufactured by adding a solution of ammonium hydroxide to a solution of chromium salt.

Pure  is as yet (2020) unknown among the mineral species. However, three natural polymorphs of the oxyhydroxide, CrO(OH), are known: bracewellite, grimaldiite and guyanaite.

References

Chromium(III) compounds
Hydroxides
Chromium–oxygen compounds